Katarzyna Milczarek-Jasińska (born 2 September 1965 in Warsaw) is a Polish dressage rider.  She represented Poland at the 2012 Summer Olympics in the team and individual dressage. 

In October 2022, Milczarek was suspended by the International Federation for Equestrian Sports after testing positive for a prohibited substance at competitions in Spring and Summer 2022.

References

Living people
1965 births
Polish female equestrians
Polish dressage riders
Olympic equestrians of Poland
Equestrians at the 2012 Summer Olympics
Sportspeople from Warsaw
Doping cases in equestrian